Liias is a surname. Notable people with the surname include:

Marko Liias (born 1981), American politician
Toni Liias (born 1986), Finnish racing cyclist

See also
Liia (given name)